Mythimna hamifera is a moth of the family Noctuidae first described by Achille Guenée in 1852. It is found in Sri Lanka, Japan and Borneo.

Its larval host plant is Saccharum.

References

External links
A Method to Observe Membranous Structures of Female Genitalia in the Inflated Condition
Non-target Lepidopteran Insects Specifically Attracted to Sex Pheromone Lures for Helicoverpa armigera and H. assulta

Moths of Asia
Moths described in 1852
Hadeninae

Mythimnini